Thermococcus alcaliphilus is a hyperthermophilic archaeon. It is coccoid-shaped and heterotrophic, first isolated from a shallow marine hydrothermal system at Vulcano Island, Italy. Its type strain is AEDII12  (DSM 10322).

References

Further reading

External links

LPSN
WORMS
Type strain of Thermococcus alcaliphilus at BacDive -  the Bacterial Diversity Metadatabase

Euryarchaeota
Archaea described in 1997